Baaghi 3 is a 2020 Indian action thriller film directed by Ahmed Khan and produced by Sajid Nadiadwala. The film is the third installment  in Baaghi series and stars Tiger Shroff, Riteish Deshmukh and Shraddha Kapoor. It also features Ankita Lokhande, Jaideep Ahlawat, Vijay Varma, Jameel Khoury, Jackie Shroff, Satish Kaushik, Virendra Saxena and Manav Gohil in pivotal roles. The story is based on Tamil film Vettai (2012).

The action sequences were choreographed by Ram-Lakshman and Kecha Khamphakdee. Principal photography of the film began on 12 September 2019 in Mumbai. The makers wanted to shoot in Syria but the producers Fox Star Studios declined due to safety issues due to which sets resembling the Syrian topography were built in Serbia.

Baaghi 3 was theatrically released in India on 6 March 2020. Upon its release, the film received mixed to negative reviews from critics and audiences and was praised for its action sequences and performances of the cast (particularly Shroff, Deshmukh, Khoury, Ahlawat, Varma and Kapoor), music, cinematography, but received criticism for the writing, direction, unrealism and work of CGI/VFX. The film's collections were affected by the COVID-19 pandemic as the theatres were shut down, though still it became a moderate commercial success. There were plans for a re-release once the outbreak would end, but the makers instead decided to release it on digital platforms. It is the second highest grossing Bollywood film of 2020.

Plot 
Ranveer "Ronnie" Charan Chaturvedi lives with his elder brother Vikram. Ronnie has been protective towards him since childhood, especially after their father Charan Chaturvedi's death. Ronnie is offered a job in the police force, but refuses because he has 33 cases registered against him all for saving Vikram and convinces him to take on the job. A timid and reluctant Vikram becomes a cop. When a hostage situation arises, Vikram is assigned the job and is terrified to face the criminals, but Ronnie accompanies him, fighting off the goons and helping rescue the hostages. He does not take credit, and this process continues with Vikram getting popular among the public and his department after each case. Ronnie later falls in love with a woman named Siya, and they get their respective siblings Vikram and Ruchi married to each other. One day, Vikram is assigned to go for routine paperwork in Syria. Upon arriving, Vikram chats with Ronnie over a video call but is suddenly beaten and kidnapped by terrorist Abu Jalal Gaza's men who break into his hotel room, and Ronnie watches helplessly as Vikram begs for Ronnie's help.

Ronnie and Siya travel to Syria, where the police refuse to help them. They meet Akhtar Lahori, who helps them track Vikram and his captors. They go to Vikram's hotel while the cops start looking for the trio. In Vikram's room, Ronnie finds Vikram's damaged phone and escapes with Siya and Akhtar before the cops can catch them. The trio finds the attacker, resulting in a chase. The exhausted attacker agrees to help before being hit by a truck and dying. Siya retrieves the attacker's phone and texts a goon named IPL (Inder Paheli Lamba) to meet at a hotel. Abu Jalal Gaza, the mastermind, arrives to avenge his brother, the attacker's death. The main cop who supports Ronnie captures IPL while Abu Jalal escapes. Fearing betrayal from IPL since he's been arrested, Abu Jalal orders his men to kill him. Ronnie and the team cleverly stage a series of events that lead to Abu's men believing they've been betrayed by IPL. They attack him, and upon being rescued by Ronnie, IPL decides to help him.

Ronnie single-handedly battles Abu Jalal's army before going to rescue Vikram and the hostages. IPL sacrifices himself, and Abu agrees to free everyone but captures Siya. Ronnie fights Abu Jalal's men, but as Vikram starts getting enraged to see Ronnie getting brutally beaten up, Ronnie stops fighting back. He is stabbed and nearly killed, causing a transformation in Vikram, who jumps out of the cell and brutally fights off everyone, finally impaling Abu Jalal on steel rods. Vikram and Siya try to revive Ronnie, and as Abu emerges to attack them from behind, Ronnie wakes and kills him. Returning to India, Vikram is honoured for his bravery while Ronnie imagines their father, a cop, saluting and hugging him for keeping his promise.

Cast 
 Tiger Shroff as Ranveer "Ronnie" Charan Chaturvedi, Vikram's younger brother and Siya's love interest
 Ayaan Zubair as Young Ronnie
 Riteish Deshmukh as Inspector Vikram Charan Chaturvedi, Ronnie's elder brother and Ruchi's husband
 Yash Bhojwani as Young Vikram
 Shraddha Kapoor as Siya Nandan Chaturvedi, Ronnie's love interest and Ruchi's younger sister
 Ankita Lokhande as Ruchi Nandan Chaturvedi, Vikram's wife and Siya's elder sister
 Jameel Khoury as Abu Jalal Gaza, leader of Jaish-e-Lashkar
 Jaideep Ahlawat as Inder Paheli Lamba/IPL
 Vijay Varma as Akhtar Lahori
 Jackie Shroff as Inspector Charan Chaturvedi, Ronnie and Vikram's deceased father (cameo appearance)
 Satish Kaushik as Bhoklelal Mupe Chatora, Agra Police Commissioner
 Virendra Saxena as Head Constable Kailash Tripathi
 Ivan Kostadinov as Zaidi Jalal Gaza, Abu Jalal Gaza's brother
 Manav Gohil as Asif, Hafeeza's husband
 Sunit Morarjee as Inspector Sharad Kute
 Shriswara as Hafeeza, Asif's wife
 Amit Sharma as Bajwa, IPL's henchman
 Actor Firdaush as Bittu bhargav,
 Danish Bhatt as Bilal Al Khatib
 Shaurya Bharadwaj as Vishwaran Chaturvedi
 Farhad Samji as a man in the gents toilet 
 Disha Patani in a special appearance in the song "Do You Love Me"

Production 
The film was announced on 19 December 2018 with Tiger Shroff by Nadiadwala Grandson Entertainment on their Twitter account by releasing a teaser poster. On 12 February 2019 Shraddha Kapoor was signed to play lead opposite Tiger Shroff. In June it was announced that Riteish Deshmukh has joined the cast of the film.
 In August 2019, it was announced that shooting of the film will take place in Morocco, Egypt, Serbia and Turkey.

Principal photography began on 12 September 2019 in Mumbai and wrapped up on 30 January 2020.

Release 
It was theatrically released in India on 6 March 2020.

Reception

Box office 
Baaghi 3 earned 17.50 crore net at the domestic box office on the opening day, which was the highest opening day collection for 2020 Bollywood film so far.

, with a gross of 110.65 crore in India and 24.42 crore overseas, the film has a worldwide gross collection of 137.05 crore and became the second highest-grossing Bollywood film of 2020.

Critical response 
Baaghi 3 received mixed reviews from critics and audiences. Taran Adarsh of Bollywood Hungama gave the film three stars out of five, praising the performances, action sequences and cinematography while criticizing the writing and Khan's direction. The Times of India gave the film two and a half stars out of five, with praise for the action sequences but criticism for the shaky camerawork, CGI and the writing. Rajeev Masand from News18 gave the film two stars out of five criticizing the direction, logicless action sequences and the plot and described the film as a "bloated mess."

Soundtrack 

The film's music was composed by Vishal–Shekhar, Tanishk Bagchi, Sachet–Parampara, Rochak Kohli and Pranaay Rijia, with lyrics written by Panchhi Jalonvi, Indeevar, Tanishk Bagchi, Shabbir Ahmed, Gurpreet Saini, Gautam G. Sharma and Ginny Diwan.

The song "Dus Bahane 2.0" is a recreation of "Dus Bahane" from the film Dus by Vishal–Shekhar. This was the first time that the duo recreated one of their song.

The song "Bhankas" was a remake of the song "Ek Aankh Marun To" from the 1984 film Tohfa, was originally composed by Bappi Lahiri, with lyrics by Indeevar and sung by Kishore Kumar and Asha Bhosle, and was recreated by Tanishk Bagchi.

The song "Do You Love Me" is a recreation of British record producer TroiBoy's song, voiced by Nikhita Gandhi and written and composed by Bagchi.

The song "Tujhe Rab Mana" is partly inspired by the iconic song "Tera Jaisa Yaar Kahan", sung by Kishore Kumar for the 1981 film Yaarana.

References

External links 
 
 

2020 action films
2020s Hindi-language films
Films scored by Sachet–Parampara
Films scored by Tanishk Bagchi
Films scored by Rochak Kohli
Films scored by Vishal–Shekhar
2020s masala films
Films about kidnapping
Films shot in Egypt
Films shot in Morocco
Films shot in Mumbai
Films shot in Serbia
Films shot in Turkey
Fox Star Studios films
Hindi remakes of Tamil films
Indian action films
Indian sequel films
Films directed by Ahmed Khan
Films about Islamic State of Iraq and the Levant
Iraq War films
Syrian civil war
Arab Spring and the media